Longueuil is a city in the province of Quebec, Canada. It is the seat of the Montérégie administrative region and the central city of the urban agglomeration of Longueuil. It sits on the south shore of the Saint Lawrence River directly across from Montreal. The population as of the Canada 2016 Census totalled 239,700, making it Montreal's second largest suburb, the fifth most populous city in Quebec and twentieth largest in Canada.

Charles Le Moyne founded Longueuil  as a seigneurie in 1657. It would become a parish in 1845, a village in 1848, a town in 1874 and a city in 1920. Between  1961 and 2002, Longueuil's borders grew three times, as it was amalgamated with surrounding municipalities; there was a strong de-amalgamation in 2006 (see 2000–2006 municipal reorganization in Quebec).

Longueuil is a residential, commercial and industrial city. It incorporates some urban features, but is essentially a suburb. Longueuil can be classified as a commuter town as a large portion of its residents commute to work in Montreal. Most buildings are single-family homes constructed in the post-war period. The city consists of three boroughs: Le Vieux-Longueuil, Saint-Hubert and Greenfield Park.

Longueuil is the seat of the judicial district of Longueuil. Residents of the city are called Longueuillois.

History

The territory of New France was divided into seigneuries in order to ensure the colony's defence. Longueuil was founded in 1657 by Charles Le Moyne, a merchant from Ville-Marie (present day Montreal), as a seigneurie. According to Abbé Faillon, Charles Le Moyne, lord of the area starting in 1657, named Longueuil after the village of Longueil (note slightly different spelling) which is today the seat of a canton in the district of Dieppe in his homeland of Normandy.

His son, Charles Le Moyne de Longueuil, built Fort Longueuil as his fortified residence. It was constructed of stone between 1685 and 1690 and had four towers.

Fort Longueuil was believed to be occupied by American troops during the American Revolutionary War. It was subsequently occupied by the British. It was demolished in  1810 due to its poor condition. The archaeological remains of Fort Longueuil were recognized as a National Historic Site of Canada on May 25, 1923.  The site extends beneath the present-day Saint-Antoine-de-Padoue Cathedral.

The seigneurial system ended in 1845 and Longueuil was turned into a parish municipality named Saint-Antoine-de-Longueuil. In 1848, a portion detached from the parish and officially established as the village of Longueuil. This same village became a town in 1874, and then a city in 1920. Musician Paul Pratt notably served as the city's mayor from 1935 to 1966.

Longueuil's city limits expanded for the first time in 1961 when it merged with Montréal-Sud, and again in 1969 when it merged with Ville Jacques-Cartier. In both cases,  Longueuil was chosen as the name of the new city.

On January 1, 2002, as part of the 2000–2006 municipal reorganization in Quebec, the provincial government amalgamated the former Longueuil with Boucherville, Brossard, Greenfield Park, LeMoyne, Saint-Bruno-de-Montarville, Saint-Hubert and Saint-Lambert. As with the 1960s, the name Longueuil was chosen for the new city.  However, after a change of government and a 2004 referendum, Boucherville, Brossard, Saint-Lambert and Saint-Bruno-de-Montarville were re-constituted as independent cities on January 1, 2006.  As such, the current city of Longueuil now includes only the former cities of Longueuil (1969-2002), Saint-Hubert, Greenfield Park and LeMoyne.

Geography

Longueuil occupies 115.59 square kilometres (44.6 sq mi) of land. The city is bordered by the cities of Saint-Lambert to the west, Brossard to the southwest, Boucherville  to the northeast, Saint-Bruno-de-Montarville to the east, and the Saint Lawrence River and Montreal to the northwest. The city of Longueuil is located approximately 7 kilometres (5 mi) east of Montreal on the south shore of the Saint Lawrence River.

Longueuil is located in the Saint Lawrence River valley, and is a vast plain. Areas near the river were originally swamp land with mixed forest, and later prime agricultural land. Agricultural land still exists in the portions of the city furthest from the river.

The city of Longueuil also includes Île Charron, a small island in the Saint Lawrence River, and part of the Boucherville Islands.

Street addresses in Longueuil increase west and east from the Chemin de Chambly, with suffixes of "Ouest" and "Est" used on east-west streets that cross it, and south from the Saint Lawrence River. (As in Montreal, the local cardinal directions are skewed to align with the shore of the river, and local grid "north" is closer to geographic northwest.)

Climate
Like Montreal, Longueuil is classified as humid continental or hemiboreal (Köppen climate classification Dfb). Longueuil has long winters, lasting from November to March, short springs during April and May, average summers, lasting from June to August, and short autumns during September and October.

Demographics 

Of the 132,570 workers in Longueuil, the median income was $26,537, which is above Quebec's provincial average of $25,464. Among the 69,990 full-time workers, the median income was $37,521 or slightly below the provincial average. Several of Montreal's most impoverished neighborhoods are located in Longueuil.

Language 
As of the 2011 Canadian Census, French was the mother tongue language of 81.4% of Longueuil's residents  while English was the first language of 7.5%. Other languages were spoken by 13.6% of the population, with the most spoken being Spanish (3.0%), Arabic (2.1%), Haitian Creole (1.2%), Romanian (0.7%), Persian (0.7%), Chinese (0.6%), Italian (0.6%) and Portuguese (0.6%). These figures include multiple responses.

Ethnicity 

People of European origins made up 87.6% of the population in 2006. The largest visible minority groups are Black (4.1%), Latin American (2%), Arab (1.6%), Chinese (1.2%), Southeast Asian (1%), and South Asian (0.7%).

Note: Totals greater than 100% due to multiple origin responses.

Economy

Although a large chunk of Longueuil's work force commute to Montreal, the city nevertheless offers many jobs in a diverse range of industries. Above all, Longueuil benefits from having very low property value despite its close proximity to Montreal.

Longueuil is particularly strong in the aerospace industry. It is home to the headquarters of both Pratt & Whitney Canada and Héroux-Devtek. Pratt & Whitney Canada is Longueuil's top employer with 5,000 employees, while Héroux-Devtek has 550 employees.  Also located in Longueuil is the headquarters of the Canadian Space Agency (John H. Chapman Space Center), adjacent to Montréal/Saint-Hubert Airport. Pascan Aviation has its headquarters in Saint-Hubert, Longueuil. Other companies based in Longueuil include Agropur, Innergex Renewable Energy, and the Canadian subsidiary of Hasbro.

In 2002 Artemano Canada, a home furnishing company was founded, with warehouse & distribution centre located in Longueuil. In 2008, Canadian Business ranked Longueuil as the 30th best place to do business in Canada.

Arts and culture

The Longueuil International Percussion Festival, which features 500 musicians, takes place over six days in July in the neighbourhood of Old Longueuil, and draws 200,000 visitors per year.

Attractions

There are three nature parks in Longueuil, Parc Marie-Victorin and Parc Michel-Chartrand in Le Vieux-Longueuil and Parc de la Cité in Saint-Hubert. It is also home to a wildlife reserve, the Boisé du Tremblay, which is partially in Le Vieux-Longueuil and partially in Boucherville.

There are seven arenas: Cynthia Coull Arena in Greenfield Park; Aréna Émile-Butch-Bouchard, Aréna Jacques-Cartier, Aréna Olympia and Colisée Jean Béliveau in Le Vieux-Longueuil; and Centre sportif Gaétan-Boucher and Centre sportif Rosanne-Laflamme in Saint-Hubert.

Notable places of worship include the Roman Catholic Co-Cathedral of Saint-Antoine-de-Padoue, the Église Nouvelle vie evangelical church, and the Montréal Québec Temple of the Church of Jesus Christ of Latter-day Saints.

Sport

Government

Municipal

The mayor is Sylvie Parent, who was elected on Nov. 5, 2017. She is the fourth mayor of Longueuil since the 2002 merger. Businessman Jacques Olivier who once served as Minister of Labour served as mayor from 2002 until 2005. The second mayor of Longueuil was Claude Gladu, serving from 2006 to 2009. He also happened to be mayor of the former city of Longueuil from 1994 to 2002. Former member of the House of Commons of Canada, Caroline St-Hilaire was the third mayor from 2009 to 2017.

The city's three boroughs are Le Vieux-Longueuil, Greenfield Park and Saint-Hubert. In total there are 26 city councillors, including one borough president each. Greenfield Park has three councillors and its borough president is Mireille Carrière of Action Longueuil. Saint-Hubert has eight councillors and its borough president is Lorraine Guay-Boivin of Action Longueuil. Le Vieux-Longueuil has fifteen councillors and its borough president is Michel Desjardins of the Parti municipal de Longueuil.

Longueuil's city hall is located in the borough of Saint-Hubert, on the edge of the city.

Federal and provincial

Federally, Longueuil is part of three electoral districts. The riding of Longueuil—Charles-LeMoyne, is represented by Sherry Romanado. The riding of Longueuil-Saint-Hubert is represented by Pierre Nantel.  The riding of Montarville, is represented by Michel Picard (politician).

Provincially, Longueuil is represented in four electoral districts. The electoral district of Laporte includes the boroughs of Greenfield Park and Saint-Hubert, and is represented by Nicole Ménard of the Quebec Liberal Party. The electoral district of Marie-Victorin, which includes the western portion of Le Vieux-Longueuil, is represented by Catherine Fournier of the Parti Québécois (PQ). The electoral district of Taillon, which covers the eastern portion of Le Vieux-Longueuil is represented by Marie Malavoy of the PQ. The electoral district of Vachon, which covers the borough of Saint-Hubert, is represented by Martine Ouellet of the PQ.

Infrastructure

Commuting patterns

According to the 2006 Census, about 39,485 city residents (17.2% of the total population) commute to work in Montreal on a daily basis, while only 38,090 residents (16.6%) work in the city itself. A further 6,915 residents (3.0%) work in Boucherville every day, 4,775 (2.1%) work in Brossard, 2,795 (1.2%) in Saint-Bruno-de-Montarville, and 1,815 (0.8%) work in Saint-Lambert, the four other constituent cities of the Longueuil agglomeration.

By contrast only 8,845 people commute from Montreal to work in Longueuil every day, while 4,080 people commute from Brossard to work in Longueuil, 2,940 people commute from Boucherville, 2,090 from Sainte-Julie, 1,825 from Saint-Bruno-de-Montarville, 1,815 from Chambly, and 1,810 from Saint-Jean-sur-Richelieu.

Roads

The Saint Lawrence River between the Island of Montreal and the south shore is traversed by only five automobile crossings. Two of these are in Longueuil, the Louis Hippolyte Lafontaine Tunnel (part of Autoroute 25) and the Jacques Cartier Bridge (part of Route 134).

Autoroute 20 is an important highway in Longueuil, bordering the Saint Lawrence River in the Le Vieux-Longueuil borough, where it co-exists with Autoroute René-Lévesque (Route 132), and finally heading eastward toward Boucherville. Autoroute 30 crosses the Saint-Hubert borough in the southern part of the city, between the cities of Brossard and Saint-Bruno-de-Montarville.

Route 116 is another major highway, with its western terminus located in LeMoyne, heading east through the borough of Saint-Hubert toward Saint-Bruno-de-Montarville. Route 112 co-exists with Route 116 from LeMoyne to Cousineau Boulevard in Saint-Hubert, where it heads southeast toward Carignan. Route 134 is a major artery, perhaps better known by its more common names: the Jacques Cartier Bridge on the portion crossing the Saint-Lawrence River, and Taschereau Boulevard which connects the bridge to all three boroughs of Longueuil, and southward toward the city of Brossard.

Public transportation

The Réseau de transport de Longueuil (RTL) provides bus service in Longueuil. There are 77 bus routes and 12 shared taxi routes serving 139,374 passengers per day, and 32,738,155 passengers in 2011. Almost all bus lines of the RTL terminate at the Longueuil Bus Terminus. Many buses terminating at the other main bus terminus, Brossard-Panama, cross the Champlain Bridge to arrive at the Terminus Centre-Ville in downtown Montreal (under the 1000 de la Gauchetière office tower, at Bonaventure Metro).

The city is also served by the Longueuil–Université-de-Sherbrooke Metro station, adjacent to the Longueuil bus terminus. The station connects to downtown Montreal via the Yellow Line of the Metro. The Réseau de transport métropolitain (RTM) runs the Mont-Saint-Hilaire commuter train line also serves the south shore. The only commuter train station in the city of Longueuil is Longueuil–Saint-Hubert station. Until the mid-1950s, Longueuil was served by interurban streetcars operated by the Montreal and Southern Counties Railway.

Longueuil also has a small airport, Saint-Hubert Airport. It is one of Canada's most important general aviation airports, ranked 12th busiest airport by aircraft movements.

A small marina, the Réal-Bouvier Marina is located on the Saint Lawrence River in the borough of Le Vieux-Longueuil. The Old Port of Montreal–Longueuil Ferry is a seasonal ferry service links the Réal-Bouvier Marina to the Jacques Cartier Pier in the Old Port of Montreal.

Hospitals

The city is served by two hospitals. The Charles-LeMoyne Hospital is a Université de Sherbrooke affiliated hospital in the borough of Greenfield Park. It is the main hospital for Longueuil, as well as the neighbouring cities of Saint-Lambert and Brossard. The Pierre-Boucher Hospital is a smaller hospital in the borough of Le Vieux-Longueuil which serves Le Vieux-Longueuil, Boucherville, Varennes, Sainte-Julie, Saint-Amable, Verchères, Calixa-Lavallée and Contrecœur.

Education

The city of Longueuil is served by several educational institutions. Both the Université de Sherbrooke and Université de Montréal  maintain campuses in the Borough of Le Vieux-Longueuil.

There is one CEGEP in Longueuil, Collège Édouard-Montpetit, located in Le Vieux-Longueuil. Collège Édouard-Montpetit has an aerotechnic school, École nationale d'aérotechnique located at a separate campus in the borough of Saint-Hubert near Saint-Hubert Airport.

There are two technical and professional colleges, both located in Le Vieux-Longueuil: these are the Pierre-Dupuy Professional Formation Centre and Collège Info-Technique.

Primary and secondary schools
Public anglophone schools are operated by the Riverside School Board. There are three secondary schools in Longueuil operated by the Riverside School Board: Centennial Regional High School in Greenfield Park, Heritage Regional High School in Saint-Hubert, and Saint-Lambert International High School in Saint-Lambert.

Public francophone schools are operated by the Commission scolaire Marie-Victorin. There are seven secondary schools in Longueuil operated by that district. École secondaire Internationale St-Edmond and École secondaire Participative l'Agora are in Greenfield Park. École secondaire André-Laurendeau and École secondaire Mgr-A.M.-Parent are in Saint-Hubert. École secondaire Gérard-Filion, École secondaire Jacques-Rousseau and École secondaire St-Jean-Baptiste are in Le Vieux-Longueuil.

Prior to 1998 the South Shore Protestant Regional School Board served the municipality.

There are also three private francophone secondary schools, all of which are in Le Vieux-Longueuil. They are Collège Charles-Lemoyne, Collège Français and Collège Notre-Dame-de-Lourdes.

Media
Longueuil and the other cities in the agglomeration are served by two free weekly French-language newspapers. Le Courrier du Sud, published by Quebecor Media, is the oldest, and contains inserts tailored to specific boroughs ("Le Journal de Saint-Hubert" for Saint-Hubert and "Le Magazine" for Greenfield Park, LeMoyne and the city of Saint-Lambert). Rive-Sud Express is a newer weekly, published by Transcontinental Media. Both "Le Courrier du Sud" and "Rive-Sud Express" are both home delivered as well as available in newspaper boxes. Point Sud is an independent monthly newspaper, also free of charge, that is carried on newspaper stands

Longueuil is also served by the CHAA-FM 103.3 radio station. Another radio station, CHMP-FM 98.5 is officially licensed to Longueuil, despite both the studio and transmitter being located in Montreal. Residents of Longueuil and adjacent communities are also served by a local cable television station, Télé Rive-Sud (TVRS), which is owned by Quebecor Media and is an affiliate of Canal Vox. It is available to Videotron cable subscribers only.

Twin towns – sister cities

Longueuil is twinned with:
 Lafayette, Louisiana, United States
 Whitby, Ontario, Canada

Notable people
 Micheline Beauchemin (1929 – 2009), textile artist and weaver
 Maxime Comtois, prospect of the Anaheim Ducks
 Jon Lajoie, comedian
 Anthony Mantha, ice hockey player for the Washington Capitals
 Émilien Néron, actor
 Judith Sainte-Marie, painter
 Abraham Toro, Major League Baseball infielder for the Milwaukee Brewers
 Zviane, graphic novelist

See also
 Michel Pratt, Michel Pratt, Longueuil 1657-2007 (French)
 Michel Pratt, Dictionnaire historique de Longueuil, version multimédia, Éditions histoire Québec
Baron de Longueuil
List of cities in Quebec

Notes

References

External links

Official site

 
Cities and towns in Quebec
Populated places established in 1657
Quebec populated places on the Saint Lawrence River
1657 establishments in the French colonial empire